The Tallahassee Tennis Challenger is a professional tennis tournament played on green clay courts. It is currently part of the Association of Tennis Professionals (ATP) Challenger Tour. It is held annually at the Forestmeadows Tennis Complex in Tallahassee, Florida, United States, since 2000.

Brian Vahaly has won two singles titles, while Bobby Reynolds, Dennis Novikov and Julio Peralta won two doubles titles, the last two together and in consecutive years.

Past finals

Singles

Doubles

External links

 
ATP Challenger Tour
Hard court tennis tournaments in the United States
Tennis tournaments in Florida
Sports in Tallahassee, Florida
Recurring sporting events established in 2000
2000 establishments in Florida
Clay court tennis tournaments